The East Devon Way is a long-distance footpath in England.

Landscapes seen on the path include estuary, high open commons, woodlands and river valleys. The route includes some fairly steep climbs but is generally not challenging.

The path runs inland but links with the South West Coast Path at both ends. There is rail access to Exmouth via branch line from Exeter and buses serve both ends of the route.

Landscape features
 River Axe
 River Lym
 River Coly
 River Exe estuary
 River Otter
 River Sid
 The Cobb breakwater and fossils at Lyme Regis

Places 

 Exmouth
 Newton Poppleford
 Sidbury
 Colyton
 Musbury
 Uplyme
 Fire Beacon Hill

References

External links
eastdevonway.org.uk

Footpaths in Devon
Long-distance footpaths in England
East Devon District
Devon, East